Auf Wiedersehen, Auf Wiederseh'n, or Auf Wiedersehn may refer to:

 "Auf Wiedersehen" (song), a 1978 song by Cheap Trick
Auf Wiedersehen (Red Garland album), 1971
Auf Wiedersehn (Demis Roussos album), 1974  
Auf Wiedersehen (Equinox album), 1989
Auf Wiedersehen (film), 1961  West German comedy film

See also
Auf Wiedersehen, Pet, British TV comedy